Phan Fa Lilat Bridge (lit: 'bridge on which the ruler of heaven proceeds', refers to "King's Cross Bridge"; usually shortened to "Phan Fa Bridge") is a historic bridge across Khlong Bang Lamphu (Bang Lamphu canal) on Ratchadamnoen Avenue on the border of Ban Phan Thom and Bowon Niwet sub-districts, Phra Nakhon District with Ban Bat sub-district, Pom Prap Sattru Phai District, inner Bangkok near Mahakan Fort, Queen Sirikit Gallery and King Prajadhipok Museum. It divides Ratchadamnoen Avenue into two parts: Ratchadamnoen Klang (ราชดำเนินกลาง; 'Central Ratchadamnoen') and Ratchadamnoen Nok (ราชดำเนินนอก; 'Outer Ratchadamnoen'), considered to be a pair with a Phan Phiphop Lila Bridge (สะพานผ่านพิภพลีลา), it is on Ratchadamnoen Nai (ราชดำเนินใน; Inner Ratchadamnoen) near the Royal Rattanakosin Hotel beside Sanam Luang.

It is not known when the bridge was built. It is assumed that it was built along with Ratchadamnoen Avenue (1899–1901), during the reign of King Chulalongkorn (Rama V).
As it is on Ratchadamnoen Avenue between Democracy Monument and Royal Plaza it has been often used as a place for political gatherings in Thai history such as the October 14 incident (1973), Black May (1992), People's Alliance for Democracy (PAD) protests both in 2006 and 2008,  United Front for Democracy Against Dictatorship (UDD) protests both in 2009 and 2010, People's Democratic Reform Committee (PDRC) protests (2013–14), etc.

See more
Phan Phiphop Lila Bridge–counterpart bridge
Makkhawan Rangsan Bridge–next bridge on Ratchadamnoen avenue

References 

Phra Nakhon district
Road junctions in Bangkok
Pom Prap Sattru Phai district
Road bridges in Bangkok
Registered ancient monuments in Bangkok